Manon van Raay (born 16 July 2003) is a Dutch footballer who plays as midfielder for ADO Den Haag in the Eredivisie.

Club career
Van Raay initially played on boy's teams at VV Unio and FC Oudewater. She then moved to the youth of ADO Den Haag.

Since summer 2020, Van Raay plays for the women's first squad of ADO Den Haag. Immediately, in her friendly-game debut against Ter Leede, coming late into the game, she scored a goal and had an assist. Her Eredivisie debut followed in December 2020, against SBV Excelsior.

During the COVID-19 pandemic in the Netherlands, Van Raay was reported to have trouble returning home on time for night curfew.

^ ongoing

International career
Van Raay played in the national under-19 team of the Netherlands. She now is a member of the national under-19 team.

Personal life
Van Raay was born in Woerden.

Honours
 Nominated for 2019 Best Young Female Athlete of Oudewater

References

External links 
 Goal by Manon van Raay

Living people
Dutch women's footballers
Eredivisie (women) players
2003 births
Women's association footballers not categorized by position
ADO Den Haag (women) players